The Jordan EJ15 was the fifteenth and last Jordan Formula One car. It was used by the team to compete in the 2005 Formula One season. The car was driven by Tiago Monteiro and Narain Karthikeyan.

Background 
Jordan had been left without an engine deal for the 2005 season after the Ford Motor Company's decision to put their engine supplier Cosworth up for sale. However, at short notice, Toyota agreed to supply Jordan with engines identical to those used by their own Formula One team and thus Jordan became the first-ever Toyota F1 customer team and also Magneti Marelli electronic control unit (ECU) packages. At the beginning of 2005, the team was sold to Midland Group for US $60 million.

The Jordan name was retained for the 2005 Formula One season, before being changed to MF1 Racing for the  season. Throughout 2005 journalists questioned whether Midland were in Formula One for the long haul. Rumours circulated throughout the season that the team was for sale, and that Eddie Irvine was interested in buying them. The year also saw the introduction of two rookie drivers, Narain Karthikeyan and Tiago Monteiro.

Racing history

Season summary 
2005 confirmed Jordan's status at the back of the grid. A final podium came at the United States Grand Prix, in which only six cars competed. Monteiro led home a Jordan 3–4. Monteiro finished eighth at Spa to give the team its final point and used the EJ15 to finish in all but one race of the season. The team's last grand prix saw a low-key exit; Monteiro finished 11th and Karthikeyan crashed out.

EJ15B 
Jordan used an updated EJ15B chassis for the final five races of the year. Monteiro gave the B spec chassis its debut in Italy whilst Karthikeyan still had the previous model. For the following race in Belgium, both drivers used EJ15Bs, and they would both see out the remainder of the season with the new chassis, with Monteiro's 8th place at Spa its best result.

After the season 
Following the end of the 2005 season, the EJ15B chassis was used in winter testing at Jerez in December 2005 by a variety of drivers including Roman Rusinov, Jeffrey van Hooydonk and Monteiro. This followed the team's rebranding to MF1 Racing, and the car featured an interim testing livery.

Sponsorship
 Sobranie
 Benson & Hedges
 Tata
 Liqui Moly
 EDP
 Bridgestone
 Steelback Brewery
 Galp Energia
 Toyota
 RE/MAX (United States Grand Prix only)

Gallery

Complete Formula One results
(key) (results in bold indicate pole position)

References

External links

Jordan Formula One cars
2005 Formula One season cars